The 1986 Idaho gubernatorial election was held on November 4, 1986 to elect the governor of the state of Idaho. Cecil Andrus, a former Democratic governor, was elected defeating the Republican Lieutenant Governor David Leroy.

This was an open seat election; longtime incumbent John V. Evans ran for the U.S. Senate, but lost.

Nominations
Republican Lieutenant Governor David Leroy announced his candidacy for governor fourteen months before the election in the autumn of 1985. Raised in Lewiston, Leroy was a former county prosecutor in Boise and state attorney general.

Democrat former governor Cecil Andrus declared his bid for governor six months later in March 1986. He held the office for six years (1971–1977), until his appointment as U.S. Secretary of the Interior (1977–1981) in the Carter Administration. Incumbent Evans, successor to Andrus in 1977, chose to run for the U.S. Senate, but lost to incumbent Steve Symms.

Both Andrus and Leroy were unopposed for their respective nominations in the statewide primary on May 27.

Campaign
As election day neared, polls showed Democrat Andrus ahead of Leroy.

Election results
It was the third of four wins for Andrus, and the fifth of six consecutive for the Democrats. Similar to the previous election in 1982 (with different candidates), the winning margin was narrow.

References

Gubernatorial
1986
1986 United States gubernatorial elections